In Mexico, the Pledge of Allegiance takes part in the national honors ceremony to the national flag of Mexico, which is celebrated every Monday in basic, middle and higher education institutions.

When the pledge of allegiance is pronounced, the right hand is extended using the Roman salute, directing it to the flag and, if necessary, turning the body in the direction of it.

Despite being common in educational institutions in Mexico, it is not part of the official flag ceremony protocols.

Text

References 

Society of Mexico
Oaths of allegiance